The following is a list of Samurai and their wives.  They are listed alphabetically by their family names.  Some changed their names and they are listed by their final names.  Note that this list is not complete or comprehensive; the total number of persons who belonged to the samurai-class of Japanese society, during the time that such a social category existed, would be in the millions.



Samurai

A
 Abe Masakatsu
 Adachi Yasumori
 Adachi Kagemori
 Adams, William (Foreign born) 
 Aiou Mototsuna
 Akai Terukage
 Akao Kiyotsuna
 Akechi Mitsuhide
 Akiyama Nobutomo
 Amago Haruhisa
 Amago Yoshihisa
 See also Amago clan
 Andō Morinari
 Ankokuji Ekei
 Aochi Shigetsuna
 Aokage Takaakira
 Aoki Kazushige
 Akahori Chohichi
 Arai Hakuseki
 Araki Motokiyo
 Araki Murashige
 Araki Muratsugu
 Arima Kihei
 Asakura Yoshikage
 Ayame Kagekatsu
 Azai Hisamasa
 Azai Nagamasa
 Azai Sukemasa

B
 Baba Nobufusa
 Bessho Nagaharu

C
 Chacha
 Chiba Shusaku Narimasa
 Chōsokabe Morichika
 Chōsokabe Kunichika
 Chōsokabe Motochika
 Chōsokabe Nobuchika

 Collache, Eugène

D

 Date Masamune
 Date Shigezane
 See also Date clan
 Doi Toshikatsu

E
Escorial Herardo (Filipino born)
 Etō Shinpei
 Endō Naotsune
 Enjoji Nobutane
 Enomoto Takeaki
 Era Fusahide

F
 Fūma Kotarō (ninja)
 Fuwa Mitsuharu
 Fukushima Masanori

G
 Gamō Katahide
 Gamō Ujisato

H
 Harada Naomasa
Harada Nobutane
 Harada Sanosuke
 Hasekura Tsunenaga
 Hattori Hanzō (ninja)
 Hatano Hideharu
 Hasegawa Eishin
 Hayashizaki Jinsuke Shigenobu
 Hayashi Narinaga
 Hijikata Toshizo
 Hirate Masahide
 Hitotsubashi Keiki
 Hōjō Masako
 Hōjō Tokimune
 Hōjō Ujiyasu
 Hōjō Ujimasa
 Honda Tadakatsu
 Honda Tadatomo
 Honganji Kennyo
 Horio Yoshiharu
 Hosokawa Fujitaka
 Hosokawa Gracia
 Hosokawa Tadaoki
 Hotta Masatoshi

I
 Ii Naoaki
 Ii Naomasa
 Ii Naomori
 Ii Naonaka
 Ii Naosuke
 Ii Naotaka
 Ii Naotora
 Ii Naoyuki
 Ii Naozumi
 Iizasa Ienao
 Ijuin Tadaaki
 Ikeda Tsuneoki
 Imagawa Ujizane
 Imagawa Yoshimoto
 Imai Kanehira
 Inaba Yoshimichi
 Inugami Nagayasu
 Ishida Mitsunari
 Isshiki Fujinaga
 Itagaki Nobukata
 Itō Hirobumi
 Iwanari Tomomichi

J
 Jinbo Nagamoto
 Jonas Tönse

K
 Kannan Kumar(Salem)
 Kakeda Toshimune
 Kaneko Ietada
 Katagiri Katsumoto
 Katakura Kojūro
 Katakura Shigenaga
 Kataoka Mitsumasa
 Katō Kiyomasa
 Kawakami Gensai
 Kido Takayoshi
 Kikkawa Hiroie
 Kimotsuki Kanetsugu
 Kitamura Kansuke
 Kobayakawa Hideaki
 Kobayakawa Hidekane
 Kobayakawa Takakage
 Konishi Yukinaga
 Kojima Toyoharu
 Kuroda Kanbei
 Kuroda Kiyotaka
 Kusunoki Masashige
 Kuwana Tarozaemon
 Kumagai Naozane

L

M
 Maeda Keiji
 Maeda Matsu
 Maeda Nagatane
 Maeda Toshiie
 Maeda Toshinaga
 Maeda Toshitsune
 Magome Kageyu
 Manabe Akifusa
 Matsudaira Katamori (7th son of Yoshitatsu)
 Matsudaira Nobutsuna
 Matsudaira Nobuyasu
 Matsudaira Higo no Kami Katamori
 Matsudaira Sadanobu
 Matsudaira Tadayoshi
 Matsudaira Teru
 Matsunaga Hisahide
 Matsunaga Hisamichi
 Matsuo Bashō
 Matsudaira Motoyasu
 Minamoto no Mitsunaka
 Minamoto no Yoshiie
 Minamoto no Yoshimitsu
 Minamoto no Yoshinaka
 Minamoto no Yoshitomo
 Minamoto no Yoshitsune
 Minamoto no Tameyoshi
 Minamoto no Yorimasa
 Minamoto no Yorimitsu
 Minamoto no Yoritomo
 Minamoto no Noriyori
 Minoro Takashi
 Miura Anjin
 Miura Yoshimoto
 Miyamoto Musashi
 Miyoshi Chōkei
 Miyoshi Kazuhide
 Miyoshi Masaga
 Miyoshi Masayasu
 Miyoshi Moriyata
 Miyoshi Nagayuki
 Miyoshi Yoshitsugu
 Mizuno Tadakuni
 Moniwa Yoshinao
 Mōri Motonari
 Mōri Nagasada
 Mori Nagayoshi
 Mōri Okimoto
 Mori Ranmaru
 Mōri Takamoto
 Mori Tadamasa
 Mōri Terumoto
 Mori Yoshinari
 Murai Sadakatsu

N
 Nagakura Shinpachi
 Nagao Harukage
 Nagao Kagenobu
 Nagao Masakage
 Nagao Tamekage
 Nakagawa Kiyohide
 Nakaoka Shintarō
 Naoe Kagetsuna
 Naoe Kanetsugu
 Narita Kaihime
 Nene
 Nihonmatsu Yoshitsugu
 Niimi Nishiki
 Niiro Tadamoto
 Niwa Nagahide
 Niwa Nagashige

O
 Oda Hiroyoshi
 Oda Nobuhide
 Oda Nobukata
 Oda Nobukiyo
 Oda Nobunaga
 Oda Nobutada
 Oda Nobutomo
 Oda Nobukatsu
 Oda Nobuyasu
 Ogasawara Shōsai
 Ōishi Kuranosuke
 Okada Izō
 Judge Ooka
 Ōta Dōkan
 Ōtani Yoshitsugu
 Ōtani Yoshiharu
 Ōtomo Sōrin
 Okita Sōji
 Ōkubo Toshimichi
 Okunomiya Masaie
 Ōuchi Yoshitaka
 Omy Yoshika
 Pore Sufi

Q

R
 Reizei Takatoyo
 Rokkaku Sadayori
 Rokkaku Yoshiharu
 Rokkaku Yoshikata
 Rusu Masakage
 Ryūzōji Takanobu
 See also Ryūzōji clan

S
 Saigo Kiyokazu
 Saigō Masako
 Sagara Taketō
 Saigō Takamori
 Saigo Yoshikatsu
 Saitō Dōsan
 Saitō Hajime
 Saito Musashibō Benkei
 Saitō Yoshitatsu
 Sakai Tadakiyo
 Sakai Tadashige
 Sakai Tadatsugu
 Sakai Tadayo
 Sakakibara Yasumasa
 Sakamoto Ryōma
 Sakuma Morimasa
 Sakuma Nobumori
 Sanada Akihime
 Sanada Komatsuhime
 Sanada Masayuki
 Sanada Nobuyuki
 Sanada Yukimura
 See also Sanada clan
 Sasaki Kojirō
 Sassa Narimasa
 Sasuke Sarutobi
 Serizawa Kamo
 Shibata Katsuie
 Shima Sakon
 Shimada Ichirō
 Shimazu Katsuhisa
 Shimazu Tadahisa
 Shimazu Tadatsune
 Shimazu Tadayoshi
 Shimazu Takahisa
 Shimazu Toyohisa
 Shimazu Yoshihiro
 Shimazu Yoshihisa
 Shindou Hiroshii
 See also Shimazu clan
 Sogo Nagayasu
 Sue Yoshitaka

T
 Tachibana Muneshige
 Tachibana Dōsetsu
 Tachibana Ginchiyo
 Taigen Sessai
 Taira no Kiyomori
 Taira Masakado
 Takahashi Shigetane
 Takenaka Shigeharu
 Takasugi Shinsaku
 Takayama Justo (Shigetomo)
 Takayama Ukon
 Takechi Hanpeita
 Takeda Katsuyori
 Takeda Nobukatsu
 Takeda Nobushige
 Takeda Shingen
 Takenaka Hanbei
 Tani Tadasumi
 Tōdō Takatora
 Toki Yorinari
 Tochimitsu Gantyoki
 Tokugawa Ieyasu
 Tokugawa Hidetada
 Tokugawa Nariaki
 Tokugawa Yoshinobu
 Torii Mototada
 Toyotomi Hidenaga
 Toyotomi Hideyoshi
 Toyotomi Hideyori
 Tozuka Tadaharu
 Tsukahara Bokuden

U
 Uesugi Kagekatsu
 Uesugi Kagetora
 Uesugi Kenshin
 Ujiie Naotomo
 Ukita Naoie
 Ukita Okiie
 Umezawa Michiharu
 Usami Sadamitsu
 Uyama Hisanobu

V

W
 Wada Shinsuke
 Watanabe Kazan
 Watanabe no Tsuna

X
Yasumero Kenshin

Y
 Yagyū Jūbei Mitsuyoshi
 Yagyū Munenori
 Yamauchi Kazutoyo
 Yamada Arinaga
 Yamada Arinobu
 Yamada Nagamasa
 Yamagata Masakage
 Yamakawa Hiroshi
 Yamakawa Kenjirō
 Yamakawa Naoe (father of Hiroshi and Kenjiro)
 Yamanaka Yukimori
 Yamanami Keisuke
 Yamaoka Tesshū
 Yanagawa Kenzaburo
 Yanagisawa Yoshiyasu
 Yonekura Shigetsugu
 Yūki Hideyasu
 Yasuke (The only known black samurai and Oda Nobunaga's bodyguard)

See also

 Ashikaga shogunate
 Kamakura shogunate
 Tokugawa shogunate
 Japanese clans

References